Ni Hao, Kai-Lan is an American animated children's television series produced by Nickelodeon Animation Studio. It began as a series of three interstitial shorts on Nick Jr. called Downward Doghouse. The first full episode was initially set to premiere in fall 2007 on Nickelodeon's Nick Jr. block in the United States, but it was pushed back to February 7, 2008, coinciding with Chinese New Year.

Ni Hao, Kai-Lan is based on the childhood memories of the show's creator, Karen Chau, who grew up in a bicultural (Chinese-American) household. "Ni hao" (你好 nǐ hǎo) means "Hello" in Mandarin, and Kai-Lan (凯兰 Kǎilán) is the Chinese name Chau was given at birth, which was later anglicized to Karen.

The first two seasons had 20 episodes each. The third season consisted of a two-part series finale. Sascha Paladino was the head writer and developer for the show.

The entire series was released on Paramount+ (at the time CBS All Access) on January 19, 2021.

Premise
The series follows the adventures of Kai-Lan and her group of talking anthropomorphic animal companions. The group consists of Kai-Lan, a 6-year-old Chinese-American girl; Rintoo, a yellow 6-year-old Bengal tiger; Tolee, a gray koala; Lulu, a light pink rhinoceros; and Hoho, a white monkey. Each episode is based around a series of events that occur during Kai-Lan's day, along with obstacles that she and her friends are forced to overcome (with "assistance" from the viewing audience) relating to riddles, playing games, and working together. Common rituals may involve Kai-Lan resolving conflicts with her friends when they feel negative emotions. To help them, Kai-Lan has the audience help her figure out why they are having difficult situations. Usually, once Kai-Lan's friends discover that their actions are wrong, they apologize and promise to work together better. The audience is usually presented with two musical sing-alongs where Kai-Lan sings about what must be done to overcome her and her friends' challenges. The episode always ends with Kai-Lan successfully helping her friends and everyone getting along. In the Season 1 finale, it is stated that they all live in California.

Other aspects generally featured in episodes are breaking the fourth wall, 11 minutes of interactivity, a target word that is repeated multiple times, a few words of Mandarin Chinese vocabulary, and before saying goodbye (at the end of each episode), Kai-Lan says, "You make my heart feel super happy." Later installments added Kai-lan saying this phrase in Mandarin after she said it in English: "Ni rang wo hao kai xin." Ni Hao, Kai-Lan introduces its viewers to the Mandarin Chinese language, along with elements of Chinese culture and values, and intergenerational families (e.g., Kai-Lan and her relationship with Ye Ye).

Episodes

Characters

Main
 Kai-Lan (voiced by Jade Lianna Peters) is a playful and adventurous 6-year-old Chinese-American girl with a big heart. She has fair skin, brown eyes and black hair that she wears in two space buns with red flowers. Kai-Lan speaks both English and Mandarin Chinese. She can also translate the languages.
Rintoo (voiced by Jack Samson) is a rambunctious and energetic yellow 6-year-old Bengal tiger with a frontal lisp.
Tolee (voiced by Khamani Griffin) is a gray koala who has a stuffed panda that he affectionately named Pandy.
Lulu (voiced by Beverly Duan) is a sweet and intelligent light pink rhinoceros. She has a red balloon tied around her horn that helps her fly.  
Hoho (voiced by Angie Wu) is an energetic white monkey and is the youngest of Kai-Lan's friends. At three, he is still very strong.
Ye-Ye (voiced by Clem Cheung (English dialogue) and Ben Wang (Chinese dialogue)) is Kai-lan's playful, thoughtful, and caring grandfather. He was born in Hong Kong and passes on his traditions to his granddaughter.
At the start of almost every episode, Kai-Lan wakes up Mr. Sun with a tickle so she can start her day.
In one corner of Kai-Lan's backyard is a teeming mini-metropolis of ants called Ant City who deliver mail and build things. San San is their leader along with his two right-hand ants, Bubu and Fufu. San San is voiced by Zachary Gordon, Bubu by Luke Manriquez, and Fufu by Kyla Rae Kowalewski.

Other, grown-up, and minor characters
 Howard (voiced by Khamani Griffin) is an owl who first appears in "The Dragonboat Festival." He delivers letters and only speaks in hoots.  
 Mr. Fluffy (voiced by Elan Garfias) is a hamster and baker who first appears in "Everybody's Hat Parade."  
 Mei Mei (Chinese for "younger sister", voiced by Laura Marano) is a shy blue polar bear.  
 Stompy (voiced by Hsiang Lo) is a big, playful blue elephant who made his first appearance in "Safari Pals."
 GuNaiNai (voiced by Ming-Na Wen) is Kai-Lan's great-aunt and Ye-Ye's sister. She appears in "Kai-Lan's Trip to China."  
 Xiao Xi Gua (meaning "little watermelon") is a baby panda. He appears in "Kai-Lan's Trip to China."
 The Peeking Mice are little, black mice who are often seen playing music. They are voiced by assorted members of the cast.
 Mr. Hoppy is a frog who speaks in ribbits.
 The Snails (voiced by assorted members of the cast especially Olivia Fine, Kwesi Boakye, Zachary Gordon and Brittany Chen) are found in one corner of Kai-Lan's backyard just like the ants.
 The Worms (voiced by assorted members of the cast especially Olivia Fine, Kwesi Boakye, Zachary Gordon and Brittany Chen) are found in one corner of Kai-Lan's backyard just like the ants.
 The Monkey King (voiced by Jack Cygan) is a monkey superhero.  
 The Fox King (voiced by James Siang'a) is a fox in The Fox Kingdom.  
 The Foxes are red foxes that live in The Fox Kingdom.
 The Bear Queen (voiced by Lucy Liu) is a bear in The Bear Kingdom.
 The Bears are brown bears that live in The Bear Kingdom.

DVD releases

Awards and nominations

Related media

Video games 
The success of Ni Hao, Kai-Lan spawned its own video game series, supported by various gaming consoles and platforms:

 Ni Hao, Kai-Lan: Super Game Day (Wii, PS2) – released, October 26, 2009
Ni Hao, Kai-Lan: New Year's Celebration (DS) – released, November 5, 2009

The show's success also spawned merchandise from 2007-2014. Kai-Lan also made appearances in Nickelodeon Fit, Nickelodeon Dance, Nickelodeon Dance 2, Dora and Kai-Lan's Pet Shelter, and Team Umizoomi & Dora's Fantastic Flight.

References

Notes

External links

 
 Official Website on nickjr.com (archived on April 30, 2015)

2000s American animated television series
2010s American animated television series
2000s Nickelodeon original programming
2010s Nickelodeon original programming
2008 American television series debuts
2011 American television series endings
2000s preschool education television series
2010s preschool education television series
American children's animated television series
American preschool education television series
Anime-influenced Western animated television series
Chinese American television
English-language television shows
Nick Jr. original programming
Nickelodeon original programming
Animated television series about children
Animated preschool education television series
Television shows set in California